Frederick Hopkinson (1 March 1922 – June 2004) was a British sports shooter. He competed in the 50 metre rifle, three positions and the 50 metre rifle, prone events at the 1956 Summer Olympics.

References

1922 births
2004 deaths
British male sport shooters
Olympic shooters of Great Britain
Shooters at the 1956 Summer Olympics
Sportspeople from Newark-on-Trent
20th-century British people